Emmanuel Ikechukwu Uzochukwu (born 14 July 1998) is a Nigerian footballer who plays as a forward for Bangladesh Premier League club Muktijoddha Sangsad KC.

Club career
In February 2022, Uzochukwu joined Nejmeh in the Lebanese Premier League, ahead of the second leg of the 2021–22 season.

References

External links
 

1998 births
Living people
Nigerian footballers
Nigerian expatriate footballers
Association football forwards
Myanmar National League players
Yangon United F.C. players
Shan United F.C. players
Nejmeh SC players
Expatriate footballers in Myanmar
Expatriate footballers in India
Expatriate footballers in Lebanon
Nigerian expatriate sportspeople in India
Nigerian expatriate sportspeople in Myanmar
Nigerian expatriate sportspeople in Lebanon
Sportspeople from Lagos